The Ambassador of the United Kingdom to Azerbaijan is the United Kingdom's foremost diplomatic representative in the Republic of Azerbaijan, and head of the UK's diplomatic mission in Baku.

After the collapse of the Soviet Union, the United Kingdom recognised the independence of Azerbaijan in December 1991. Diplomatic relations were re-established in March 1992 and the then British ambassador to Russia, Sir Brian Fall, was also accredited to Azerbaijan until the first resident ambassador arrived in 1993.

Ambassadors
1992–1993: Sir Brian Fall (non-resident)
1993–1997: Thomas Young
1997–2000: Roger Thomas
2000–2003: Andrew Tucker
2004–2007: Laurie Bristow
2007–2011: Carolyn Browne
2011–2013: Peter Bateman
2013–2016: Irfan Siddiq
2016–2019: Carole Crofts

2019–:  James Lyall Sharp

References

External links
UK and Azerbaijan, gov.uk

Azerbaijan
 
United Kingdom Ambassadors